The 2016 National Cup was the 24th edition of the Vietnamese Cup. It was sponsored by Kienlongbank, and known as the Kienlongbank National Cup for sponsorship purposes. This year's competition, which features 24 teams including V.League 1's 14 teams and National First Division's 10 teams, ran until September 29.

Round one

Round two

Quarter-finals

1st Legs

2nd Legs 

Hà Nội T&T 3-1 on aggregate

QNK Quảng Nam 4-1 on aggregate

Becamex Bình Dương 8-4 on aggregate

Than Quảng Ninh 3-3 on aggregate

Semi-finals

1st Legs

2nd Legs 

Than Quảng Ninh 1-1 on aggregate

Hà Nội T&T 7-5 on aggregate

Finals

1st Legs

2nd Legs 

Than Quảng Ninh 6-5 on aggregate

References

External links
  Official website

Vietnamese National Cup
2016 domestic association football cups
Cup